Hilipinus is a genus of pine weevils in the beetle family Curculionidae. There are at least 50 described species in Hilipinus.

Species
These 50 species belong to the genus Hilipinus:

 Hilipinus acatium Kuschel, 1955
 Hilipinus acutissimus Kuschel, 1955
 Hilipinus aequabilis Kuschel, 1955
 Hilipinus alternatus Kuschel, 1955
 Hilipinus amictus Kuschel, 1955
 Hilipinus ascius Champion & G.C., 1902
 Hilipinus bartelsi Champion & G.C., 1902
 Hilipinus biannulatus Champion, 1910
 Hilipinus biguttatus Champion & G.C., 1902
 Hilipinus biplagiatus Chevrolat & Laa, 1902
 Hilipinus brulei Rheinheimer, 2010
 Hilipinus cadivus Kuschel, 1955
 Hilipinus corruptor Champion & G.C., 1902
 Hilipinus costirostris Kuschel, 1955
 Hilipinus curvirostris Champion & G.C., 1902
 Hilipinus dahlbomi Champion & G.C., 1902
 Hilipinus dentirostris Champion & G.C., 1902
 Hilipinus egenus Champion & G.C., 1902
 Hilipinus friesi Champion & G.C., 1902
 Hilipinus fusiformis Champion & G.C., 1902
 Hilipinus granicostatus Champion & G.C., 1902
 Hilipinus granosus Champion & G.C., 1906
 Hilipinus guatemalensis Champion & G.C., 1902
 Hilipinus guyanensis (Hustache, 1938)
 Hilipinus ingens Champion & G.C., 1902
 Hilipinus integellus Champion & G.C., 1902
 Hilipinus lacordairei Champion & G.C., 1902
 Hilipinus laticollis Champion & G.C., 1902
 Hilipinus maculosus Kuschel, 1955
 Hilipinus medioximus Champion & G.C., 1902
 Hilipinus moraguesi Rheinheimer, 2010
 Hilipinus mortuus Champion & G.C., 1902
 Hilipinus mucronatus Champion & G.C., 1902
 Hilipinus nearcticus O'Brien, 1982
 Hilipinus occultus Champion & G.C., 1902
 Hilipinus ochreopictus Champion & G.C., 1902
 Hilipinus plagiatus Kuschel, 1955
 Hilipinus planiusculus Kuschel, 1955
 Hilipinus punctatoscabratus Champion & G.C., 1902
 Hilipinus quadrimaculatus Champion & G.C., 1902
 Hilipinus sahlbergi Kuschel, 1955
 Hilipinus scabiosus Champion & G.C., 1902
 Hilipinus scapha (Boheman, 1835)
 Hilipinus stratioticus Kuschel, 1955
 Hilipinus strator Kuschel, 1955
 Hilipinus sulcicrus Champion & G.C., 1902
 Hilipinus sulcirostris Champion & G.C., 1902
 Hilipinus testudo Kuschel, 1955
 Hilipinus tetraspilotus Champion & G.C., 1902
 Hilipinus ziegleri Champion & G.C., 1902

References

Further reading

 
 
 

Molytinae
Articles created by Qbugbot